This is a list of archivists. An archivist is an information professional who assesses, collects, organizes, preserves, maintains control over, and provides access to records and archives determined to have long-term value. Some of the people listed here were not professional but amateur archivists, although their archivist activities preserved large amounts or important data.

Archivists

See also 
 List of female archivists
 Archival science
 List of archives
 List of national archives
 List of digital preservation initiatives

References

External links
 Society of American Archivists website
 Australian Society of Archivists website
 International Council on Archives